Boath Assembly constituency is a constituency of Telangana Legislative Assembly, India. It is one of 2 constituencies in Adilabad district. It comes under Adilabad Lok Sabha constituency along with 6 other Assembly constituencies.

Rathod Bapu Rao  of Telangana Rashtra Samithi is currently representing the constituency.

Mandals
The Assembly Constituency presently comprises the following Mandals:

Election Data

Election results

Telangana Legislative Assembly election, 2018

Telangana Legislative Assembly election, 2014

See also
 List of constituencies of Telangana Legislative Assembly

References

Assembly constituencies of Telangana
Adilabad district